Gonionota praeclivis is a moth in the family Depressariidae. It was described by Edward Meyrick in 1921. It is found in Peru.

The wingspan is about 16 mm. The forewings are reddish fuscous with a suffused dark fuscous streak along the dorsum from one-fourth to two-thirds. The second discal stigma is small and white and there is a slight very oblique whitish mark on the costa at two-thirds. The hindwings are dark grey.

References

Moths described in 1921
Gonionota